This is a list of Myanmar women's international footballers who have played for the Myanmar women's national football team.

Players

See also 
 Myanmar women's national football team

References 

 
International footballers
Myanmar
Association football player non-biographical articles